Kuda Naga (a.k.a. Kunchanaga) was King of Anuradhapura in the 2nd century, whose reign lasted from 195 to 196. He succeeded his brother Cula Naga as King of Anuradhapura and was assassinated and succeeded by his brother-in-law, Siri Naga I.

See also
 List of Sri Lankan monarchs
 History of Sri Lanka

References

External links
 Kings & Rulers of Sri Lanka
 Codrington's Short History of Ceylon

K
K
K
K